Fantl is a surname. Notable people with the surname include:

Jan Fantl (born 1954), German film producer
Richard Fantl (1903–1961), American film editor
Thomas Fantl (1928–2001), German film director and screenwriter

See also
Fanti